Mata Roma is a municipality in the state of Maranhão in the Northeast region of Brazil. In 2020 it was estimated to have 16,977 inhabitants.

The municipality lies in the Munim River basin.

See also
List of municipalities in Maranhão

References

Municipalities in Maranhão